Jakapur Dam, is an earthfill dam on local river near Umarga, Osmanabad district in state of Maharashtra in India.

Specifications

Purpose
 Irrigation

See also
 Dams in Maharashtra
 List of reservoirs and dams in India

References

Dams in Osmanabad district
Dams completed in 1977
1977 establishments in Maharashtra